The Aurora Fox Arts Center is located at 9900 E Colfax Avenue in Aurora, Colorado in the Aurora Cultural Arts District. It is the City of Aurora's performing arts center run by the City of Aurora Cultural Services Division and supported by the many theater-goers.

Building
Originally a movie theater, the building first opened on October 30, 1946. The building, a modified Quonset hut, was first used for military purposes at the nearby Lowry Army Air Force Base.

Resident Organizations
 Aurora Symphony Orchestra - As of October 2017, the Aurora Fox Arts Center once again became the home of the Aurora Symphony Orchestra (ASO).

External links
Aurora Fox Arts Center - official site

References

Buildings and structures in Aurora, Colorado
Performing arts centers in Colorado
Tourist attractions in Arapahoe County, Colorado
1946 establishments in Colorado
Theatres completed in 1946